Sam Smith (Alan Verner Smith 1908–1983) was an artist, craftsman, and sculptor, especially known for his toy-making for adults and children, carving small wooden curios such as boats and seaside dioramas. He signed much of his 1930s work "Alan V". Later, he signed items "Sam Smith, England" as it became successful and sold in London (for instance in Primavera shop) and New York. He painted (mostly in oils)  and signed many pictures. 

During the Second World War, he worked as a draughtsman, for instance producing technical drawings for the development of the Bailey Bridge in Christchurch, Dorset.. 

After the war, he, his wife Gladys, and Jasper Jowett lived in the steep-hillside house named "The Golf House" overlooking Kingswear, Devon, and across the River Dart to Dartmouth. For making toys, Sam had many modern wood-cutting tools in his studio in their house.

See also
 Tim Hunkin

References

External links
 Sam Smith "Genuine England" – a 1976 film by the Arts Council in which Smith explained his work
 Biography, Sam Smith 1908-1983 – personal website

1908 births
1983 deaths
Alumni of Arts University Bournemouth
Alumni of the Westminster School of Art
People educated at Victoria College, Jersey
Toy designers